Craven FitzHardinge Berkeley (May 1805 – 1 July 1855) was a British Whig politician.

Background
Berkeley was the seventh son of Frederick Berkeley, 5th Earl of Berkeley, and Mary, daughter of William Cole. He was the younger brother of William Berkeley, 1st Earl FitzHardinge, Maurice Berkeley, 1st Baron FitzHardinge and Henry FitzHardinge Berkeley (born to the same mother but declared illegitimate according to a decision by the House of Lords) and also of the Hon. Grantley Berkeley.

Political career
Craven entered Parliament for Cheltenham in 1832, a seat he held until 1847. In the 1847 general election the seat was won by Sir Willoughby Jones, but his election was declared void in May the following year. Berkeley was elected in his place in June 1848 but his election was declared void two months later. In 1852 he was again successfully returned for the constituency, and held the seat until his death three years later.

Family
Berkeley married firstly Augusta, daughter of Sir Horace St Paul, 1st Baronet and widow of George Henry Talbot, in 1839. They had one daughter. After Augusta's death in April 1841, aged 28, he married secondly Charlotte, daughter of General Denzil Onslow, in 1845. Berkeley died in July 1855, aged 50. His daughter Louisa Mary succeeded as 15th Baroness Berkeley in 1882. Charlotte Berkeley died in January 1897.

References

External links 
 
Biography at thepeerage.com

1805 births
1855 deaths
Younger sons of earls
Members of the Parliament of the United Kingdom for English constituencies
Whig (British political party) MPs for English constituencies
UK MPs 1832–1835
UK MPs 1835–1837
UK MPs 1837–1841
UK MPs 1841–1847
UK MPs 1847–1852
UK MPs 1852–1857
Craven
Politics of Cheltenham